Angerville is a commune in the Calvados department in the Normandy region of northwestern France.

The inhabitants of the commune are known as Angervillais or Angervillaises

Geography
Angerville is located some 30 km east by north-east of Caen and 20 km west of Pont-l'Eveque on the A13 autoroute which passes through the commune south of the village but has no exit in the commune. The nearest exit is Exit  to the west of the commune. Access to the commune is by the D675 road which runs parallel to and south of the A13 autoroute from Dozulé to Danestal. The D287 runs north from the D675 through the commune to the D142 which passes through the north-west of the commune running from Dozule to Gonneville-sur-Mer. Access to the village is solely by the dead-end Chemin de l'Eglise which runs west off the D287.

The Ancre river runs from west to east through the south of the commune and is joined by several other streams. The Ruisseau de Caudimuche forms much of the eastern border.

Administration

List of Successive Mayors

Population

Sites and monuments
The Church of Saint-Leger is a small church from the 12th century not far from a trout fishing pond.

See also
Communes of the Calvados department

References

External links
Angerville on Géoportail, National Geographic Institute (IGN) website 
Angerville on the 1750 Cassini Map

Communes of Calvados (department)